Mikosch Comes In is a 1928 German silent comedy film directed by Rolf Randolf and starring Gyula Szőreghy, Lydia Potechina, and Claire Rommer.

The film's sets were designed by the art director Ernő Metzner.

Cast

References

Bibliography

External links

1928 films
Films of the Weimar Republic
German silent feature films
Films directed by Rolf Randolf
1928 comedy films
German comedy films
Military humor in film
German black-and-white films
Silent comedy films
1920s German films